The 20.3 cm SK C/34 was the main battery gun used on the German Admiral Hipper-class heavy cruisers.

Description
These built-up guns consisted of a rifled tube encased within an inner and outer jacket with a horizontal sliding breech block.  The breech was sealed with an 18 kg (40 lb) brass case containing 30 kg (66 lb) of smokeless powder with a 160 gram (5.6 oz) gunpowder igniter.  A cloth bag containing an additional 21 kg (40 lb) of smokeless powder and 380 grams (13 oz) of gunpowder was loaded between the projectile and the brass case.  Each gun could fire approximately five rounds per minute.  Useful life expectancy was 510 effective full charges (EFC) per barrel.

Naval service

Coast defence guns
The four turrets intended for the incomplete cruiser  were installed as coastal artillery in France.
The turrets A (Anton) and D (Dora) at Battery Karola on the Ile de Re (4./Marine Artillerie Abteilung 282).
And the turrets B (Bruno) and C (Cäsar) at Battery Seydlitz on the Ile de Croix (5./Marine Artillerie Abteilung 264).

Railway guns
Eight barrels from the incomplete cruiser were given to the army and followed rebuild to 20.3 cm K (E) railway guns.

Shell trajectory

See also

Weapons of comparable role, performance and era
203mm/50 Modèle 1924 gun French equivalent
203 mm /53 Italian naval gun Italian equivalent
20 cm/50 3rd Year Type naval gun Japanese equivalent
BL 8 inch Mk VIII naval gun UK equivalent
8"/55 caliber gun US equivalent

Footnotes
Notes

Citations

References

External links

 Tony DiGiulian, German 20.3 cm/60 (8") SK C/34

Naval guns of Germany
203 mm artillery
World War II naval weapons
Coastal artillery
Military equipment introduced in the 1930s